The 2023 Supercopa Ecuador, known as the 2023 Supercopa Ecuador Ecuabet for sponsorship purposes, was the third edition of the Supercopa Ecuador, Ecuador's football super cup. It was held on 11 February 2023 between the 2022 Ecuadorian Serie A champions Aucas and the 2022 Copa Ecuador champions Independiente del Valle at Estadio La Cocha in Latacunga.

In the match, Independiente del Valle defeated Aucas 3–0 to win their first Supercopa Ecuador title.

Teams
For the 2023 season, the competition returned to the single-match format originally used, unlike the previous Supercopa Ecuador edition (2021) which was contested by six teams. Due to this, the champions of both the Ecuadorian Serie A and the Copa Ecuador were the only two teams that played the competition.

Details

References

2023 in Ecuadorian football
Supercopa Ecuador 2023